Bharathi is an Indian actress who has appeared in the Tamil film industry. The actress won critical acclaim for her performance as a prostitute in Ammuvagiya Naan (2007) and later appeared in other Tamil and Malayalam language films.

Career
Bharathi was signed on by director Padmamagan to be a part of Ammuvagiya Naan (2007), after several leading actresses had turned down the role. She portrayed a prostitute who attempts to ease back into society, and won critical acclaim for her portrayal with a reviewer noting she was "blessed with a role of her lifetime". Despite the success of Ammuvagiya Naan, Bharathi failed to get good offers in Tamil films and instead signed on to feature in Malayalam films. The actress signed on to appear in Anwar Rasheed's Annan Thambi (2008) opposite Mammootty, but was later replaced by Lakshmi Rai. She then however moved on to work in Biju Pal's Aayudham (2008), featuring alongside Suresh Gopi. The film failed to become a box office success, and subsequently failed to garner further big budget film offers for Bharathi. She was also seen in Agathiyan's romantic film Nenjathai Killadhe (2008) with Vikranth and in Satrumun Kidaitha Thagaval (2009), a low-budget thriller, featuring stunt choreographer Kanal Kannan in the leading role.

Bharathi subsequently turned down approaches to be a part of Engal Aasan (2009) and Enga Raasi Nalla Raasi (2009), and chose to quit the film industry after her marriage to her manager, Murugan. In 2010, she expressed a desire to make a comeback to acting. She began work on Rudhram, a television soap drama on Jaya TV in late 2012.

Filmography
Films
All films are in Tamil, unless otherwise noted.

Television
Rudhram (Jaya TV)
Adhey Kangal (Jaya TV)
Kalyani (surya tv)
Sondha Bandham
(Sun TV)

References

External links

Living people
Actresses in Tamil cinema
Actresses from Tamil Nadu
People from Thoothukudi district
Indian film actresses
Actresses in Malayalam cinema
21st-century Indian actresses
Actresses in Tamil television
Indian television actresses
1951 births